The 7th Saturn Awards were awarded to media properties and personalities deemed by the Academy of Science Fiction, Fantasy and Horror Films to be the best in science fiction, fantasy and horror released in the year 1980. They were awarded on July 26, 1980.

Winners and nominees
Below is a complete list of nominees and winners. Winners are highlighted in bold.

Film awards

Special awards

Hall of Fame
 The Rocky Horror Picture Show

Life Career Award
 Gene Roddenberry
 William Shatner

George Pal Memorial Award
 John Badham

Most Popular International Performer
 Roger Moore

Outstanding Achievement to the Academy
 Robert V. Michelucci
 William G. Wilson Jr.

External links
 1980 Awards at IMDb
 Official Saturn Awards website

Saturn
Saturn Awards ceremonies
Saturn